Jean Addington is a Canadian psychiatrist and professor at the University of Calgary. Her research focus is on psychosis and schizophrenia with the goal of finding predictors and mechanisms for mental illness. She is a Fellow of the Royal Society of Canada.

Research and Career 

Addington studies individuals at high risk of developing psychosis and people in the first stages of a psychotic illness. One goal of her research is to predict which people will convert to psychosis, which are individuals that are typically in their late teens and early twenties. Such an approach could lead to screening for early signs of risk of psychosis. Addington is developing and testing new treatments that could prevent the onset of psychosis for these high risk individuals.

Addington holds the Novartis Chair for Schizophrenia Research at the University of Calgary and became a Fellow of the Royal Society of Canada in 2020. She also received the Richard J. Wyatt Award from the International Association for Early Intervention in Mental Health in 2020.

References

External links
 University profile
 personal website

Living people
Canadian psychiatrists
Canadian women psychiatrists
21st-century Canadian women scientists
21st-century Canadian physicians
Year of birth missing (living people)
Place of birth missing (living people)